Farissol is a Jewish surname.

People with the surname include:
 Abraham Farissol (–1525 or 1526), Jewish-Italian mathematician and astronomer
 Jacob ben Chayyim Comprat Vidal Farissol, Provençal Jewish scholar
 Moses Botarel Farissol, 15th-century Jewish astronomer and mathematician
 Yehuda Farissol, Jewish-Italian mathematician and astronomer

Jewish surnames